The 1983 Donnay Open was a men's tennis tournament played on outdoor clay courts at the Nice Lawn Tennis Club in Nice, France, and was part of the 1983 Volvo Grand Prix. It was the 11th edition of the tournament and was held from 21 March until 27 March 1983. Unseeded Henrik Sundström won the singles title.

Finals

Singles
 Henrik Sundström defeated  Manuel Orantes 7–5, 4–6, 6–3
 It was Sundström's first singles title of his career.

Doubles
 Libor Pimek /  Bernard Boileau defeated  Bernard Fritz /  Jean-Louis Haillet 6–3, 6–4

References

External links
 ITF tournament edition details

Donnay Open
1983
Donnay Open
Donnay Open
20th century in Nice